Vanina Ickx (born 16 February 1975) is a Belgian racing driver.

Career
Ickx was born in Brussels on 16 February 1975. She is the daughter of racing driver Jacky Ickx and his first wife Catherine. Ickx started racing at a relatively late age, entering the BMW Compact Cup in 1996, partnering the Cup's most successful entrant, Stéphane De Groodt. For 1997 she got a Cup racer of her own, before she moved up to the Belgian Procar series in 1998, which ran to Super Production regulations. She shared a BMW 320i with Sylvie Delcour. In 1998 Ickx transferred to the Renault team, partnered by Frenchman Franck Lagorce. She scored her first podium that year, but on the downside, when sharing a car with her father Jacky, she crashed out of the Spa 24 Hours, admittedly by her own fault. She remained a part of the Renault team in 1999. In 2000, she joined Renault, resulting in a career-high third place overall in that year's Spa 24 Hours. That same year she would also score her first victory in the Ferrari Challenge.

Already having participated in two Rally Raid events the year before, she entered the Dakar Rally for the first time in 2000, co-driving with her father, Jacky. Since then she has entered the raid two more times, the last time being in 2002.

In 2001, she tried her hand at single-seater racing for the first time, participating in the U.S. F2000 National Championship. The rest of the year she filled with guest appearances in races in Europe: the 24 Hours of Le Mans, the Belgian Toyota Yaris Cup, the Porsche Supercup, and the Spa 24 Hours.  With the exception of the Formula 2000 and the 24 Hours of Le Mans, Ickx's 2002 racing schedule was pretty similar to the one she had in 2001.

Her studies demanding more of her time as she neared graduation, 2003 proved to be a rather quiet year with participation at Le Mans and Spa-Francorchamps, another Ferrari Challenge event and a guest-outing in the Formula Renault V6 Eurocup at Estoril.

For 2004 she once again had a full-time program, this time in the Belcar championship.  The Belcar campaign proved successful as the year ended with Ickx taking home the Ladies Trophy. She scored another victory in the Ferrari Challenge, while finishing on the podium at the Oman Desert Rally Raid and the Monza round of the short-lived Formula X championship. She collected a class victory in the Spa 24 Hours and made a guest appearance in the Porsche Supercup at the Belgian Grand Prix.

2005 saw Ickx continue in the Belcar championship, racing the same Mini Cooper she did the year before, and she netted her first class victory in the Tourisme division.  At the same time, having made her debut in the Le Mans Endurance Series the year before in the GT class, she entered the LMP1 division by finishing third three times in a row, driving the Rollcentre Racing Dallara SP1.  Another class victory came her way at the Chinese round of the FIA GT Championship, racing a Belgian-made Gillet Vertigo in the invitation class.

Ickx was hired by Audi to race in the Deutsche Tourenwagen Masters in 2006 and 2007, but was replaced by Katherine Legge for 2008.

In October 2011 she participated in the World Solar Challenge for the Umicore Solar Team. and in the Intercontinental Le Mans Cup.

She was the first driver to get behind the wheel of the Citroën Survolt (a concept electric racing car) at Le Mans on 12 July 2010.

Vanina lives with her boyfriend Benjamin de Broqueville in Wiesbaden. Together, they have one son named Ado who was born in April 2013.

Career results

Complete DTM results

(key) (Races in bold indicate pole position) (Races in italics indicate fastest lap)

Complete GT1 World Championship results

Le Mans

Pikes Peak International Hill Climb

References

External links
Vanina Ickx career statistics at Driver DB.com

Living people
1975 births
Racing drivers from Brussels
Belgian racing drivers
Formula Renault V6 Eurocup drivers
Deutsche Tourenwagen Masters drivers
24 Hours of Le Mans drivers
European Le Mans Series drivers
FIA GT1 World Championship drivers
Porsche Supercup drivers
Walloon sportspeople
24 Hours of Spa drivers
Signature Team drivers
Kolles Racing drivers
Audi Sport drivers
Larbre Compétition drivers
Nürburgring 24 Hours drivers
Porsche Carrera Cup Germany drivers
Volkswagen Motorsport drivers
Belgian female racing drivers